The New Orleans, Opelousas and Great Western Railroad (NOO&GW) was chartered in 1852. Construction began at Algiers, across the Mississippi River from New Orleans, in late 1852. By 1857, the track had reached Brashear (now Morgan City) on Berwick Bay, and this remained the end of the line for over 20 years.

In 1869, steamship operator Charles Morgan bought the NOO&GW and began operating it as owner. In 1878 he organized his railroad property as Morgan's Louisiana and Texas Railroad and Steamship Company, and it eventually became part of the Southern Pacific Company's main line. The line is currently owned and operated by BNSF.

Leadership
From the establishment of the company in 1852 until 1862, Benjamin Flanders (later Reconstruction Governor of Louisiana and Mayor of New Orleans) was the Secretary and Treasurer of the line. In 1869, the company was bought by Charles Morgan.

History

Planning for the railroad began in 1851. The company was organized as the New Orleans, Opelousas and Great Western Railroad company to run  from Algiers to Washington and Opelousas. The start date was likely October 1852 with an optimistic completion date set for January 1855. Bad weather, heavy rains, periodic flooding, and a yellow fever epidemic delayed the rail reaching Boutte in late 1853 and another six months to reach Des Allemands. A bridge  was required to cross Bayou Des Allemands. When the rail did not reach Lafourche Crossing until November 1854 it was already clear the completion date was overly optimistic. A 10 mile stretch of land referred to as "trembling prairie" meant piling and trestles had to be used on the rail bed almost the entire distance. At [[Bayou Lafourche a unique  draw bridge had to be constructed.

References

External links
New Orleans, Opelousas and Great Western Railroad at  The Historic New Orleans Collection

Defunct Louisiana railroads
Rail lines receiving land grants
Predecessors of the Southern Pacific Transportation Company
Railway companies established in 1852
Railway companies disestablished in 1869
5 ft 6 in gauge railways in the United States
1852 establishments in Louisiana